Tovin or Tevin may refer to:
 Tovin, Kaghazkonan
 Tevin, Kandovan